Ferrovie Emilia Romagna (FER) is railway company serving the Emilia-Romagna region in Italy. The company also operates buses.

The company was formed in 1997 by acquisition by the  Emilia-Romagna region of four previous state-owned railway companies:
the Ferrovie Padane (FP, which managed the Ferrara–Codigoro railway);
the Ferrovia Suzzara–Ferrara SpA (FSF);
the Gestione Commissariale Governativa delle Ferrovie Venete - Ferrovia Bologna-Portomaggiore (FBP);
the Gestione Commissariale Governativa delle Ferrovie Venete - Ferrovia Parma-Suzzara (FPS).

On 1 January 2008, it also acquired the railway branch of the ATCM of Modena, and, on 1 February 2009, Reggio Emilia's ACT, as well as FBV, becoming the only railway company in Emilia-Romagna.

Emilia-Romagna currently owns 59.44% of FER, the rest belonging to the provinces of Bologna, Mantua, Ferrara, Modena, Parma, Ravenna, Reggio Emilia and Rimini.

Services
Ferrovie Emilia Romagna is the infrastructure manager for the following railway lines:
 Parma–Suzzara
 Suzzara–Ferrara
 Ferrara–Codigoro–Pomposa
 Bologna–Portomaggiore–Dogato
 Modena–Sassuolo
 Reggio Emilia-Guastalla
 Reggio Emilia-Ciano d'Enza
 Reggio Emilia-Sassuolo
 Casalecchio–Vignola railway

In the past, FER also used to operate passenger services on the formerly listed lines as well as the following lines, owned by Rete Ferroviaria Italiana (RFI):
 Bologna–Ferrara
 Poggio Rusco–Bologna
 Modena–Mantua
 Ferrara–Rimini
 Parma–Fornovo
 Fornovo–Fidenza
 Bologna–Rimini–Pesaro
 Parma–Bologna

Railway transport is now carried out by a separate company, Trenitalia Tper.

FER also operates goods transports on its network and on the RFI one.

Road transport
FER includes a road transport division, with buses connecting several cities in the provinces of Ferrara, Bologna and Rimini.

See also
Transportation in Italy

References

External links
Official website 

Railway companies of Italy
Transport in Emilia-Romagna
Railway companies established in 2002
Italian companies established in 2002